NYCC may refer to:

 National Young Composers Challenge
 New York Chiropractic College
 New York City Council
 New York Comic Con
 New York Communities for Change
 North Yorkshire County Council
 New York Cycle Club, a recreational bicycle club
 N.Y.C.C., a former Eurodance project who charted with a cover of "(You Gotta) Fight for Your Right (To Party!)"